Estádio da Universidade de Lavras, sometimes called Estádio Universitário, is a multi-use stadium in Lavras, Brazil. It is currently used mostly for football matches. The stadium holds 30,000. It is owned by the Lavras Federal University.

External links
Templos do Futebol

Universidade de Lavras
Sports venues in Minas Gerais